Mycolicibacillus koreensis (formerly Mycobacterium koreense) is a slow-growing, non-chromogenic species of Mycolicibacillus originally isolated from the sputum of a human patient. It grows at temperatures from 25–37 °C and is susceptible to quinolones. The genome of M. koreensis contains a tRNA array that contains a long non-coding RNA called GOLDD.

References

Acid-fast bacilli
koreensis
Bacteria described in 2012